Paul Tyler Kroll is an American professional boxer. As an amateur Kroll was a member of the United States Boxing Team in the light middleweight division at 2016 Summer Olympics, but failed to qualify for the games. As of September 2022, he is ranked 39th best Welterweight by BoxRec.

References

Living people
Boxers from Philadelphia
Year of birth missing (living people)
American male boxers